Reece Prescod (born 29 February 1996) is a British sprinter. He won the silver medal in the 100 metres at the 2018 European Championships and bronze for the 4 × 100 m relay at the 2022 World Championships.

Prescod is a two-time British 100 m champion, and national champion over 60 metres indoors once.

Career
Reece Prescod qualified in first place at the GB trials to gain selection for the 2017 World Championships in Athletics, ahead of former World Championships finalist James Dasaolu. He competed in the men's 100 metres at the event, finishing seventh in the final.

Having retained his British title in 2018, he finished second in the final of the 2018 European Athletics Championships, behind teammate Zharnel Hughes.

Prescod broke the 10-second barrier in the 100 metres for the first time in 2018 and did it four times that year (including a wind-assisted 9.88 s at the Eugene Diamond League event in Oregon, U.S.).

Statistics
Information from World Athletics profile.

Personal bests

International competitions

Circuit wins, and National titles
 Diamond League
 2018: Shanghai (100m)
 British Athletics Championships
 100 metres: 2017, 2018
 British Indoor Athletics Championships
 60 metres: 2023

Seasonal bests

References

External links

 

1996 births
Living people
Athletes from London
British male sprinters
English male sprinters
World Athletics Championships athletes for Great Britain
British Athletics Championships winners
Black British sportspeople
Athletes (track and field) at the 2020 Summer Olympics
Olympic athletes of Great Britain
Olympic male sprinters